The 21st annual Life OK Screen Awards are the annual Life OK Screen Awards held to honor the best films of 2014 from the Hindi-language film industry (commonly known as Bollywood). The ceremony was held at Bandra Kurla Complex, Mumbai on 14 January 2015 hosted by actor Shahrukh Khan.

Queen led the ceremony with 14 nominations, followed by Haider and Kick with 12 nominations, and Highway and Mardaani with 11 nominations each.

Haider won 5 awards, including Best Actor (for Shahid Kapoor) and Best Supporting Actress (for Tabu), thus becoming the most-awarded film at the ceremony.

Awards 

The winners and nominees have been listed below. Winners are listed first, highlighted in boldface, and indicated with a double dagger.

Jury Awards

Technical Awards

Popular Choice Awards

Special awards

Superlatives

References

External links 
 The Screen Awards (2015) at the Internet Movie Database

Screen Awards